The Boulevard at the Capital Centre was an open-air shopping center in Lake Arbor, Prince George's County, Maryland; it had a Largo postal address. It was located on the former site of the Capital Centre, previously the home of the Washington Bullets and Washington Capitals.

Opened in 2003, the Boulevard at the Capital Centre was located next to the Largo Town Center Washington Metro station (the eastern terminus of the Blue and Silver Lines). The facility had more than 70 establishments. It was formerly the home of short-lived chain restaurant Gladys Knight & Ron Winans' Chicken & Waffles.

Though it was envisioned as a middle-class destination when it opened, the mall soon began to struggle. Its more desirable retailers closed and were replaced with downscale offerings like T-shirt and cell phone shops; many vacancies also remained. It also experienced problems with crime: five people were killed at the mall between 2005 and 2009, and there were 101 car break-ins in 2008.

In November 2017, the shopping center closed to build the new University of Maryland Capital Region Medical Center. In addition there were to be new luxury apartments, restaurants, and a shopping center. 

When the Boulevard closed, surviving businesses included Chick-Fil-A, TGI Friday's, Chuck E. Cheese's, Carolina Kitchen, The Magic Johnson Theater (AMC Theatres), Phoenix Salon, Longhorn Steakhouse, and Golden Corral. The area will be known as Downtown Largo once completed.

The University of Maryland Capital Region Health was completed and opened on June 8, 2021.

References

Further reading
Williams, K. (2002, Oct 24). Work begins on site of capital centre mall: [FINAL edition]. The Washington Post 
Goo, Sara Kehaulani. 2002. More retail tenants sign up for capital centre complex: [FINAL edition]. The Washington Post, Jun 11, 2002.
Goo, Sara Kehaulani. 2002. Cap center may be razed soon in redevelopment: [FINAL edition]. The Washington Post, Apr 19, 2002. 
Goo, Sara Kehaulani. 2002. New lease on life for proposed mall; deals with retailers recharge project: [FINAL edition]. The Washington Post, Apr 25, 2002. 
Goo, Sara Kehaulani. 2001. Capital centre builders plan online presence; web site to connect shoppers to venues: [FINAL edition]. The Washington Post, Mar 22, 2001. 
Cohn, Meredith. 2002. Developers break ground for capital centre project ; 40 retail tenants commit to $80 million center on former sports arena site: [FINAL edition]. The Sun, Oct 22, 2002. 
Goo, Sara Kehaulani. 2001. Turn of events shrinks grand project: [FINAL edition]. The Washington Post, Aug 09, 2001. 
Officials, residents sold on retail center: [FINAL edition]. 2003. The Washington Post, Nov 20, 2003. 
Ovetta Wiggins - Washington Post, Staff Writer. 2008. Pr. george's mall to ban unsupervised teens at night. The Washington Post, May 03, 2008. 

Shopping malls established in 2003
Shopping malls in Maryland
Buildings and structures in Prince George's County, Maryland
2003 establishments in Maryland
Shopping malls in the Washington metropolitan area
The Cordish Companies
Shopping malls disestablished in 2017
2017 disestablishments in Maryland
Demolished shopping malls in the United States